Yuriy Ivanovich Kovbasenko (born 26 October 1958, Horodyshche, Cherkasy Oblast) is a Ukrainian philologist and teacher. He is author of over 200 scientific works on philology and literary education, including monographs, tutorials for middle and high school, approved by the Ministry of Education and Science of Ukraine.

External links 
 Page on Boris Grinchenko Kyiv University site

1958 births
Living people
People from Cherkasy Oblast
Ukrainian philologists
Ukrainian educators